Untereisesheim is a municipality in the district of Heilbronn in Baden-Württemberg in Germany.

References

External links
 

Heilbronn (district)
Populated places on the Neckar basin
Populated riverside places in Germany